Palmar Sur Airport  is an airport serving the adjacent towns of Palmar Norte and Palmar Sur in Osa Canton, Puntarenas Province, Costa Rica.

The airport is on the southern bank, and north approach and departure cross the river. There is a mountain immediately north of Palmar Norte, and mountainous terrain northwest through northeast of the airport.

The airport is owned and administered by the country's Directorate General of Civil Aviation (DGAC), and is currently served by one daily scheduled flight from San José, plus frequent charter services.

Taxis are available outside the airport. By bus, it costs approximately US$0.20 to Palmar Norte or US$0.60 to Sierpe. It is often used by travelers and tourists who are visiting Sierpe, San Buenaventura, Chontales, Ojochal, and Uvita.

In July, 2018, the airport was closed for major renovations and enhancements.  The airport was scheduled to re-open in January 2019.

The airport officially reopened in August 2019. Costa Rica President Carlos Alvarado Quesada attended celebrating the re-opening of Palmar Sur Airport, on August 23, 2019.

Airlines and destinations

Passenger Statistics
These data show number of passengers movements into the airport, according to the Directorate General of Civil Aviation of Costa Rica's Statistical Yearbooks.

See also

 Transport in Costa Rica
 List of airports in Costa Rica

References

External links
SkyVector - Palma Sur Airport
Our Airports - Palmar Sur Airport

Airports in Costa Rica
Buildings and structures in Puntarenas Province